Shivpratap Garudjhep is a 2022 Marathi language historical drama film directed by Kartik Kendhe and produced by Jagadamba Creations. It was theatrically released on 5 October 2022 and digitally premiered on 4 November 2022 on TFS Play.

Cast 

 Amol Kolhe as Chatrapati Shivaji Maharaj
 Pratiksha Lonkar as Jijabai
 Yatin Karyekar as Aurangzeb
 Harak Amol Bhartiya as Shambhu Raje

 Alka Kaushal as Jagantara 
 Manva Naik as Soyrabai
 Adi Irani as Jafar Khan
 Shailesh Datar as Mirza Raje
 Savita Marpekar
 Pallavi Vaidya as Putalabai
 Harish Dudhale as Ramsingh
 Shripad Panse as Moropant Pingale
 Vishwajeet Phadte as Faulad Khan
 Ramesh Rokade as Hiroji Farzad 
 Ajay Talkire as Bahiirji Naik

Release

Theatrical 
Shivpratap Garudjhep was theatrically released on 5 October 2022 in Maharashtra.

Home media 
After the theatrical release, the film was OTT release on 4 November 2022 on TFS Play.

Reception

Critical Reception 
A Times of India review gave the film a 3 out of 5 star rating.

References

External links 

 

2022 films
2020s Marathi-language films
Indian historical drama films
2020s Indian films